Ranjeet Nikam (born 20 September 1999) is an Indian cricketer who represents Maharashtra in domestic cricket. 

He made his Twenty20 debut on 16 January 2021, for Maharashtra in the 2020–21 Syed Mushtaq Ali Trophy. He made his List A debut on 25 February 2021, for Maharashtra in the 2020–21 Vijay Hazare Trophy.

References

External links
 

1999 births
Living people
Indian cricketers
Maharashtra cricketers
Place of birth missing (living people)
People from Kolhapur